Georges Darmois (24 June 1888 – 3 January 1960) was a French mathematician and statistician.  He pioneered in the theory of sufficiency, in stellar statistics, and in factor analysis. He was also one of the first French mathematicians to teach British mathematical statistics.

He is one of the eponyms of the Koopman–Pitman–Darmois theorem and sufficient statistics and exponential families.

Biography 
Darmois was born on 24 June 1888 in Éply. He was admitted to École normale supérieure in 1906 and passed subsequently the agrégation de mathematiques in 1909. From 1911 to 1914, he was a qualified assistant (agrégé préparateur) at the École normale supérieure, where his scientific activities were directed by Émile Borel who rapidly appreciated his talent.

Darmois earned his doctorate from the University of Paris in 1921. He defended a thesis on algebraic curves and partial differential equations before the jury consisting of Émile Picard and Édouard Goursat. In 1949, he succeeded Maurice René Fréchet as the Chair of Calculus of Probabilities and Mathematical Physics at the University of Paris, who had himself succeeded Emile Borel. His research spanned several fields of pure and applied mathematics, including geometry, general relativity, physics, statistics, time series, and econometrics.

He was elected fellow of the Econometric Society in 1952.
In 1955 he was elected as a Fellow of the American Statistical Association. He was also the president of International Statistical Institute from 1953 until 1960.

Contributions
His scientific contributions include:
 Giving the first rigorous proof of Fréchet–Darmois–Cramér–Rao inequality, also known as Cramér–Rao bound, in 1945 independently from Rao and Cramér.
 Developing the notion of Koopman–Darmois family of distributions also known as the exponential family of distributions.
 Establishing Koopman–Pitman–Darmois theorem
 Characterizing Gaussian distributions with Darmois–Skitovich theorem

References

External links
 
 
 Correspondence between Ronald Fisher and Georges Darmois
 Laurent Mazliak (2010)  Borel, Fréchet, Darmois: La découverte des statistiques par les probabilistes français. Journal Electronique d'Histoire des Probabilités et de la Statistique December. 
 John Aldrich (2010) Tales of Two Societies: London and Paris 1860-1940 Journal Electronique d'Histoire des Probabilités et de la Statistique December.

1888 births
1960 deaths
French mathematicians
20th-century American mathematicians
University of Paris alumni
Academic staff of the University of Paris
Presidents of the International Statistical Institute
Members of the French Academy of Sciences
Fellows of the American Statistical Association
Fellows of the Econometric Society